Millardini is a tribe of muroid rodents in the subfamily Murinae. Species in this tribe are found in South and Southeast Asia.

Species 
Species in the tribe include:

 Millardia division
 Genus Cremnomys
 Cutch rat, Cremnomys cutchicus
 Elvira rat, Cremnomys elvira
 Genus Diomys - Manipur mouse
 Crump's mouse, Diomys crumpi
 Genus Madromys
 Blanford's rat, Madromys blanfordi
 Genus Millardia - Asian soft-furred rats
 Sand-colored soft-furred rat, Millardia gleadowi
 Miss Ryley's soft-furred rat, Millardia kathleenae
 Kondana soft-furred rat, Millardia kondana
 Soft-furred rat, Millardia meltada
 Pithecheir division
 Genus Pithecheir - monkey-footed rats
 Red tree rat, Pithecheir melanurus
 Malayan tree rat, Pithecheir parvus
 Genus Pithecheirops
 Bornean pithecheirops, Pithecheirops otion

References 

Old World rats and mice
Mammal tribes